Cedar Mountain may refer to:
Cedar Mountain, North Carolina, an unincorporated community in Transylvania County, North Carolina, United States
Cedar Mountain, Virginia, a piedmont monadnock in Culpeper County, Virginia
Battle of Cedar Mountain
Cedar Mountain (Wyoming), also known as Spirit Mountain, near the town of Cody

See also
Cedar Mountain Formation, a sedimentary rock formation layer in Utah
Cedar Mountain Range, a mountain range in New Mexico
Cedar Mountains (disambiguation)